Maria Tusch (1 December 1868 – 25 July 1939) was an Austrian trade unionist and politician. In 1919 she was one of eight women elected to the Constituent Assembly, becoming the country's first female parliamentarians. She remained in parliament until 1934, when she was arrested and imprisoned following the Austrian Civil War.

Biography
Tusch was born Maria Pirtsch in Klagenfurt in 1868, the daughter of an unmarried maid. She began working in a tobacco factory aged 12. Becoming involved in trade unionism, she became a shop steward and then a member of the works council. This provided a route into politics and she rose to become chair of the women's committee of the Carinthia branch of the Social Democratic Party (SdP). She also sat on the municipal committee of Sankt Ruprecht on the outskirts of Klagenfurt, She married Anton Tusch, a railway worker and also an SdP member. The couple adopted a daughter.

Tusch was a SdP candidate in the 1919 Constituent Assembly elections and was one of eight women elected, becoming Austria's first female parliamentarians. She was re-elected in 1920, 1923, 1927 and 1930. During her time in parliament she focused on women's rights, World War I veterans and abortion rights.

She died of pneumonia in 1939.

References

1868 births
1939 deaths
Politicians from Klagenfurt
People from the Duchy of Carinthia
Social Democratic Party of Austria politicians
Members of the Constituent National Assembly (Austria)
Members of the National Council (Austria)
Austrian trade unionists
20th-century Austrian women politicians